The Takhinsha Mountains are a mountain range in Haines Borough and the Hoonah-Angoon Census Area in the U.S. state of Alaska, in the southeastern part of the state.

"Takhinsha" is a Tlingit name reported by E. C. Robertson of the U.S. Geological Survey and published in 1952.

The mountains include Krause Mountain, named for geographer Aurel Krause and located 16 miles west-southwest of Haines.

References

Landforms of Hoonah–Angoon Census Area, Alaska
Mountain ranges of Alaska
Mountains of Haines Borough, Alaska
Mountains of Unorganized Borough, Alaska